Mapeta xanthomelas is a species of snout moth and the type species in the genus Mapeta. It was described by Francis Walker in 1863 and is known from Jamaica and Mexico to Venezuela.

References

Moths described in 1863
Pyralinae